The 1889 Brooklyn Bridegrooms won the American Association championship by two games over the St. Louis Browns.

Offseason 
 December 23, 1888: Al Mays and Dave Orr were purchased from the Bridegrooms by the Columbus Solons.
 Prior to 1889 season: Paul Radford was purchased from the Bridegrooms by the Cleveland Spiders.

Regular season

Season standings

Record vs. opponents

Roster

Player stats

Batting

Starters by position 
Note: Pos = Position; G = Games played; AB = At bats; R = Runs; H = Hits; Avg. = Batting average; HR = Home runs; RBI = Runs batted in; SB = Stolen bases

Other batters 
Note: G = Games played; AB = At bats; R = Runs; H = Hits; Avg. = Batting average; HR = Home runs; RBI = Runs batted in; SB = Stolen bases

Pitching

Starting pitchers 
Note: G = Games pitched; IP = Innings pitched; W = Wins; L = Losses; ERA = Earned run average; BB = Bases on balls; SO = Strikeouts; CG = Complete games

Other pitchers 
Note: G = Games pitched; IP = Innings pitched; W = Wins; L = Losses; ERA = Earned run average; SO = Strikeouts

1889 World Series 

The Bridegrooms played in the 1889 World Series representing the American Association against the New York Giants, champions of the National League. The Giants won the series, 6 games to 3. This series would be the first meeting between these two historic rivals.

Notes

References 
Baseball-Reference season page
Baseball Almanac season page

External links 
Brooklyn Dodgers reference site
Retrosheet

Los Angeles Dodgers seasons
Brooklyn Bridegrooms season
Brooklyn
19th century in Brooklyn
Park Slope